Neel Rajar Deshe (  "In the Land of the Blue King") (2008) is a Bengali film Directed by Riingo Banerjee.

Plot
This "adventure story for kids" actually revolves around a naughty and adolescent kid, Raja’s (Aryann Bhowmik) adventures during his holidays spent in his home in the picturesque backdrop of North Bengal at the foothills of the mountains. Once, while he is playing with his bunch of friends and kid sister Chhoti (Tathoi Deb), near the forests, he discovers a child, his body covered with festering wounds from rat bites and mice bites, hidden in a big hole in the ground. He finds out from a television news channel that Neel, the son of wealthy parents, has been kidnapped and kept hidden in the hole for a ransom. The chief kidnapper, a sinister character named Pandey is hiding in Raja’s house as Raja’s father, a taxi-driver, is involved in the kidnapping. In a moment of greed, he helped deliver the kidnapped child in his taxi. Pandey panics when he realises that Raja has chanced upon the truth and holds Raja’s family captive in their own house.

Cast
Indrani Haldar
Ashish Vidyarthi
Rajesh Sharma
Tathoi Deb
Aryann Bhowmik
Rishav
Nirban 
Bobby
Aishwarya
Bumba

Crew
 Producer(s): Rajeev Mehra
 Director: Riingo Banerjee
 Story: Riingo Banerjee
 Production Design: Ashish Adhikary
 Dialogue: Riingo Banerjee
 Lyrics: Sugata Guha
 Editing: Riingo Banerjee
 Cinematography: Riingo Banerjee
 Screenplay: Riingo Banerjee, Padmanava Dasgupta
 Music: Bickram Ghosh, Som Rishi Samik

Music
The music was composed by Bickram Ghosh.

The tracks from the film include:

Critical reception

References

External links

 gomolo.in
www.upperstall.com
www.screenindia.com

2008 films
2000s Bengali-language films
Bengali-language Indian films
Indian children's films
Films directed by Riingo Banerjee
Films scored by Bickram Ghosh